Swan Lake is a shallow lake in Nicollet County, in the U.S. state of Minnesota.

Dakota people named the lake Marrah Tanka, their word for swan. Trumpeter swans are native to Minnesota and nest on Swan Lake. Tundra swans migrate through the area in spring and fall, but do not nest on the lake.

See also
List of lakes in Minnesota

References

External links
 Conroy, Tom, "Swan Lake  Revival: Ducks and  a  Whole Lot More", Minnesota Conservation Volunteer, January—February 1989, p. 41.  Minnesota Department of Natural Resources.
 Mahmoodi, Cyrus, "The Swan Lake Restoration Project (Minnesota), Restoration and Reclamation Review, Vol. 7, No 4 (Fall 2001), University of Minnesota Department of Horticultural Science.
 "Swan Lake", The U.S.—Dakota War of 1862, Minnesota Historical Society.
 "Swan Lake" (video), Fowl in the Air, Fire in the Ground, Prairie Sportsman, Pioneer Public Television, 2017.
 Ward, Amy, "Calling  Ducks  Back  to  Swan  Lake", Minnesota Conservation Volunteer, March—April 1986, p. 27.  Minnesota Department of Natural Resources.

Lakes of Minnesota
Lakes of Nicollet County, Minnesota